Sophia, Lady Burrell (1753–1802) was an English poet and dramatist.

Biography
She was born Sophia Raymond, eldest daughter of Charles Raymond of Valentines, Essex, on 11 April 1753. On 13 April 1773 she married William Burrell, Member of Parliament for Haslemere and came into possession, it is said, of 100,000 pounds, then an exorbitant amount of money. A baronetcy was granted to her father in 1774, the year after her marriage, with remainder to her husband and her male issue by him.

Writings
From 1773 to 1782 Lady Burrell's pen was employed on vers de société, varied by such heavier matter as Comala, from Ossian, in 1784. Lady Burrell published two volumes of collected poems in 1793, and also the Thymriad from Xenophon, and Telemachus. In 1800 Lady Burrell wrote two tragedies. The first was Maximian, dedicated to William Lock, the second Theodora, dedicated by permission to Georgiana Cavendish, Duchess of Devonshire. In 1814 Lady Burrell's tragedy Theodora was reprinted in The New British Theatre (vol. i.), a collection of rejected dramas.

Later life
In 1787 her husband's health failed, and they retired to a seat at Deepdene. In 1796 William Burrell died, Lady Burrell having had two sons and two daughters by him. On 23 May 1797 she was remarried at Marylebone Church to the Reverend William Clay, a son of Richard Augustus Clay of Southwell, Nottinghamshire.

Lady Burrell and William Clay retired to Cowes, Isle of Wight, where she died on 20 June 1802, aged 52.

References

1753 births
1802 deaths
18th-century British women writers
English women poets
English dramatists and playwrights
Daughters of baronets
18th-century English women
18th-century English people